The 2016 Iranian Futsal 2nd Division will be divided into a few phases.

The league will also be composed of 29 teams divided into four divisions. All divisions of 7 teams, whose teams will be divided carefully. Teams will play only other teams in their own division, once at home and once away for a total of 7 matches each.

Teams

Group 1

Group 2 

1 Ailin Gostarsh Renamed to Lavazem Khanegi Mahyan.

Group 3 

1 Heyat Rostaei va Ashayeri Renamed to Madan Kan Pajohan.

Group 4 

1 Soltan Yazd Renamed to Eisatis Yazd.
2 Perspolis Zabol Renamed to Hamun Zabol.

Note: Mes Kerman and Shahin Kuhdasht Withdrew from the league before the start of competition.

Number of teams by region

Standings

Group 1

Group 2

Group 3

Group 4

Play Off 

Winner qualifies for the main round.

First leg

Return leg

Main round

See also 
 2015–16 Iranian Futsal Super League
 2015–16 Futsal 1st Division
 2015–16 Persian Gulf Cup
 2015–16 Azadegan League
 2015–16 Iran Football's 2nd Division
 2015–16 Iran Football's 3rd Division
 2015–16 Hazfi Cup

References 

Iran Futsal's 2nd Division seasons
3
3